Cyrtococcum is a genus of Asian, African, and Pacific Island plants in the grass family.

 Species
 Cyrtococcum bosseri A.Camus  - Madagascar
 Cyrtococcum capitis-york B.K.Simon  - Queensland
 Cyrtococcum chaetophoron (Roem. & Schult.) Dandy - tropical Africa
 Cyrtococcum deccanense Bor - India, Sri Lanka
 Cyrtococcum deltoideum (Hack.) A.Camus - Madagascar
 Cyrtococcum fuscinode (Steud.) A.Camus - Comoros
 Cyrtococcum humbertianum A.Camus - Madagascar
 Cyrtococcum longipes (Hook.f.) A.Camus - India, Myanmar to Andaman Islands
 Cyrtococcum multinode (Lam.) Clayton - Tanzania, Uganda, Madagascar, Comoros, Mauritius, Réunion
 Cyrtococcum nossibeense A.Camus - Madagascar
 Cyrtococcum oxyphyllum (Steud.) Stapf  - China, Indian Subcontinent, Southeast Asia, Papuasia, Queensland, several Pacific Island groups
 Cyrtococcum patens (L.) A.Camus - China, Indian Subcontinent, Southeast Asia, Papuasia, Queensland, several Pacific Island groups
 Cyrtococcum tamatavense A.Camus  - Madagascar
 Cyrtococcum trigonum (Retz.) A.Camus - Kenya, Tanzania, Indian Subcontinent, Southeast Asia, New Guinea, several Pacific Island groups

 formerly included
see Panicum 
 Cyrtococcum sparsicomum - Panicum sparsicomum

References

Panicoideae
Poaceae genera